Osteochilus intermedius is a species of cyprinid fish endemic to Sumatra and Borneo.

References

Taxa named by Max Carl Wilhelm Weber
Taxa named by Lieven Ferdinand de Beaufort
Fish described in 1916
Osteochilus